Harry Ray Gardner (June 1, 1887 – August 2, 1961) was a pitcher in Major League Baseball. He played for the Pittsburgh Pirates.

References

External links

1887 births
1961 deaths
Major League Baseball pitchers
Pittsburgh Pirates players
Baseball players from Michigan
Oakland Oaks (baseball) players
Boise Irrigators players
Bozeman Irrigators players
Vancouver Beavers players
St. Paul Saints (AA) players
St. Paul Apostles players
Kansas City Blues (baseball) players
Salt Lake City Bees players
Lincoln Tigers players
Portland Beavers players
Great Falls Electrics players
Tacoma Tigers players
Sacramento Senators players
Seattle Rainiers players
Seattle Indians players
People from Quincy, Michigan